This is a list of common names of lichen genera. When a common name for a lichen genus is the same as the scientific name for that genus, it is not included in the following list. This list only includes genera common names that are widely used, as indicated by the common name either appearing in a peer reviewed scientific publication or in a scientifically reliable reference source.

A common name for a lichen genus will often uniquely refer to that genus, but not always. Sometimes the same common name may refer to several different genera, which may not be related by sharing common ancestry. An example is that "wart lichen" refers to at least five different genera in four different families. Sometimes the same genus may have more than one widely used common name. For example, members of the genus Staurothele are commonly called "wart lichens", and also "rock pimples". Lichen genus common names my come from the shape, color, or other feature of some members of a genus. Other members may not share that trait, but are still referred to by the common name for the genus. For example, Caloplaca albovariegata is an orange lichen, but it is not orange in color.

Lichen species common names are often the same as the common name of the genus they are in, or are a modification of that common name by adding an adjective. But sometimes the parts of a lichen species common name are common names of other lichen genera. For example, Psilolechia lucida, in the genus Psilolechia, is commonly called "sulphur dust lichen". But "sulphur lichen" refers to the genus Fulgensia, and "dust lichen" refers either to the genus Chrysothrix or the genus Lepraria.

B

C

D

E

F

G

H

J

K

L

M

N

O

P

R

S

T

U

V

W

References

Lists of lichens
Fungus common names